Andrew Otten (born 15 May 1989) is a former professional Australian rules football player who played for the Adelaide Football Club in the Australian Football League (AFL). Otten was Adelaide’s second selection in the 2007 National Draft, pick 27 overall, having recorded strong results at the 2007 NAB AFL Draft Camp ranking in the top 2% for the vertical leap (92 cm), top ten for agility and the top 20% for the beep test (14.2).

Early life
Otten attended Whitefriars College in Donvale, graduating in 2007. He played junior football for the Whitehorse Colts, located in Box Hill North. Otten played basketball in his teen years.

AFL career

Otten made his debut in round 12 against eventual premiers , and played one more game for the 2008 season. The next season, he exploded onto the AFL scene, playing a consistent role as Adelaide's third tall in defence and being likened to former defender Nathan Bassett. Otten won an AFL Rising Star nomination in round 9 for his performance against , in which he collected 23 possessions and kicked a goal, and at the end of the season was voted the runner-up in the ward to Daniel Rich. Otten also scored three votes in the 2009 Brownlow Medal count.

In his 2010 pre-season training, Otten ruptured his left ACL and missed the entire 2010 season as a result. He returned successfully in 2011, playing 15 games in defence and in the midfield.

Otten re-established himself in the side in 2013, playing every game and spending time up forward, where he kicked 15 goals, and in the ruck as well as his usual defence position. He was rewarded with the Coach's Award for his willingness to fill any role in the team as needed, and also finished in the top five in the Malcolm Blight Medal for the club's best and fairest player. He also signed a new two-year deal with the Crows at the end of the season. This ruled him out of the game for another 12 months.

Otten made his return in Adelaide's SANFL reserves side in July 2015. He played out the year there, often featuring in the side's best players. At the end of the season he signed another two-year contract keeping him at the club until 2017.

Otten returned to AFL football for the first time in 960 days in Round 1, 2017 against . In the next match, when teammate Josh Jenkins was taken from the ground in the first quarter due to a rib injury, Otten had to take over his role as a part-time ruckman and a key forward, kicking one goal. His stint in the forward line was extended when teammate Mitch McGovern suffered a hamstring injury in the last quarter of the Round 3 Showdown. This enabled him to become a key player in the Crows side as a third tall forward, and he kicked a career-high four goals in the Crows' Round 10 match against , where they won by 100 points.

Statistics
 Statistics are correct to end of 2016 season

|- style="background:#eaeaea;"
! scope="row" style="text-align:center" | 2008
| style="text-align:center" | 
| 22 || 2 || 0 || 2 || 7 || 6 || 13 || 4 || 3 || 0.0 || 1.0 || 3.5 || 3.0 || 6.5 || 2.0 || 1.5
|-
! scope="row" style="text-align:center" | 2009
| style="text-align:center" | 
| 22 || 24 || 1 || 1 || 160 || 293 || 453 || 139 || 45 || 0.0 || 0.0 || 6.7 || 12.2 || 18.9 || 5.8 || 1.9
|- style="background:#eaeaea;"
! scope="row" style="text-align:center" | 2011
| style="text-align:center" | 
| 22 || 15 || 2 || 2 || 115 || 152 || 267 || 74 || 46 || 0.1 || 0.1 || 7.7 || 10.1 || 17.8 || 4.9 || 3.1
|-
! scope="row" style="text-align:center" | 2012
| style="text-align:center" | 
| 22 || 6 || 0 || 0 || 44 || 34 || 78 || 30 || 15 || 0.0 || 0.0 || 7.3 || 5.7 || 13.0 || 5.0 || 2.5
|- style="background:#eaeaea;"
! scope="row" style="text-align:center" | 2013
| style="text-align:center" | 
| 22 || 22 || 15 || 4 || 166 || 147 || 313 || 102 || 50 || 0.7 || 0.2 || 7.6 || 6.7 || 14.2 || 4.6 || 2.3
|-
! scope="row" style="text-align:center" | 2014
| style="text-align:center" | 
| 22 || 10 || 0 || 0 || 63 || 56 || 119 || 33 || 20 || 0.0 || 0.0 || 6.3 || 5.6 || 11.9 || 3.3 || 2.0
|- class="sortbottom"
! colspan=3| Career
! 79
! 18
! 9
! 555
! 688
! 1243
! 382
! 179
! 0.2
! 0.1
! 7.0
! 8.7
! 15.7
! 4.8
! 2.3
|}

References

External links

1989 births
Living people
Australian rules footballers from Melbourne
Adelaide Football Club players
Australian people of Dutch descent
Oakleigh Chargers players
Adelaide Football Club (SANFL) players